Baaltars (combination of "Baal" and "Tarsus"; Aramaic: בעלתרז B‘LTRZ) was the tutelary deity of the city of Tarsus in the Persian Empire. His depiction appears on coins of the Persian governors (satraps) of Cilicia at Tarsus before the conquests of Alexander the Great, in the 5th and 4th century BCE, such as Datames, Pharnabazes, and Mazaios, and also on coins of the early Seleucid Empire. The equivalent of Baaltars for the Greeks was Zeus.

Notes

References
 Wayne G. Sayles, Ancient Coin Collecting VI: Non-Classical Cultures Krause Publications, 1999, 
 James Hastings, S R Driver, A Dictionary of the Bible: Volume IV, Part II (Shimrath - Zuzim) The Minerva Group, Inc., 2004

See also
Achaemenid coinage

Persian mythology
Achaemenid Empire
Baal